Morristown and Erie Railroad Whippany Water Tank is located in Hanover Township, Morris County, New Jersey, United States. The water tank was built in 1904 by the Morristown and Erie Railroad and was added to the National Register of Historic Places on September 6, 2006.

See also
Whippany Railway Museum
National Register of Historic Places listings in Morris County, New Jersey
Operating Passenger Railroad Stations Thematic Resource (New Jersey)

References

Hanover Township, New Jersey
Transportation buildings and structures in Morris County, New Jersey
Industrial buildings and structures on the National Register of Historic Places in New Jersey
Railway buildings and structures on the National Register of Historic Places
National Register of Historic Places in Morris County, New Jersey
Transport infrastructure completed in 1904
New Jersey Register of Historic Places
Railway buildings and structures on the National Register of Historic Places in New Jersey
Water supply infrastructure on the National Register of Historic Places
Water tanks on the National Register of Historic Places